North Hsinchu is a railway station on the Taiwan Railways Administration West Coast line and Neiwan line located in East District, Hsinchu City, Taiwan.

History
The station was opened on 11 November 2011.

Around the station
 Aqueduct Museum of Hsinchu City

See also
 List of railway stations in Taiwan

References

2011 establishments in Taiwan
Railway stations in Hsinchu
Railway stations opened in 2011
Railway stations served by Taiwan Railways Administration